Gulsadi is a village in the Karmala taluka of Solapur district in Maharashtra state, India.

Demographics
Covering  and comprising 502 households at the time of the 2011 census of India, Gulsadi had a population of 2227. There were 1172 males and 1055 females, with 266 people being aged six or younger.

References

Villages in Karmala taluka